This is a list of Somali poets.

Somali society is synonymous with poetry and also has a longstanding oratory tradition. Of internationally available published verse, Arabic poetry has the oldest and most diverse corpus. With Greater Somalia's proximity to the Middle East, similar attachments to poetry exist in Somali culture and traditions. Poetry has played an important role in Somali society since antiquity. Urban and rural poets memorized entire volumes of poems, with some spanning centuries.

A
 Abdillahi Suldaan Mohammed Timacade
 Abdulle GeDada Masiti
 Aadan-Gurey Maxamed Cabdille
  Yamyam - Abdulkadir Hersi Siyad
Abdulle Raage Taraawiil

F
 Farah Hussein Sharmarke

H
 Haji Ali Majeerteen
 Hassan Sheikh Mumin

I
 Ismail Mire

K
 k'naan

L
 Ladan Osman

M
 Mohamed Ibrahim Warsame (Hadraawi)
 Mohammed Abdullah Hassan (Sayid Mohamed)
 Mohamud Siad Togane
 |{ Maxmed Gacal Xaayoow|}

N
 Nuruddin Farah

S
 Said Salah Ahmed
 Shadya Yasin
 Shaykh Sufi

W
 Warsame Shire Awale
 Warsan Shire
 Yamyam

References

Somalia
Poets
Somalian poets